Zolani Marali (5 May 1977 – 4 February 2022) was a South African lightweight boxer.

Life and career
Marali was born in Eastern Cape, South Africa. Marali won a bronze medal in the flyweight category at the 1999 All-Africa Games in Johannesburg. In April 2009, he won the International Boxing Organization (IBO) superfeatherweight boxing title after defeating Gamaliel Diaz. He had previously won the titles for World Boxing Foundation super bantamweight and super featherweight as well as IBO super bantamweight.

Marali died on 4 February 2022, at the age of 44.

|-

|-

References

1977 births
2022 deaths
People from Mdantsane
Lightweight boxers
South African male boxers
African Games bronze medalists for South Africa
African Games medalists in boxing
Competitors at the 1999 All-Africa Games
Sportspeople from the Eastern Cape